Virginia Lake may refer to:

 Virginia Lake, a character in the TV series UFO
 Virginia Lake (Sawtooth Wilderness), a glacial lake in Boise County, Idaho
 Virginia Lakes, a cluster of lakes in California, United States

See also 

 Lake Virginia (disambiguation)